This is a list of people who have served as Custos Rotulorum of Radnorshire.

 John Baker
 John Knill Aug, 1547
 Thomas Lewis 1564
 Gelli Meyrick 1598 
 William Vaughan 1622
 Charles Price 1641–1645
 Richard Jones 1645–?
 Interregnum
 Sir Edward Harley 1660–1685
 Charles Somerset, Marquess of Worcester 1685–1689
 Sir Rowland Gwynne 1689–1702
 Robert Harley, 1st Earl of Oxford and Earl Mortimer 1702–1714
 Thomas Coningsby, 1st Earl Coningsby 1714–1721

For later custodes rotulorum, see Lord Lieutenant of Radnorshire.

References

Institute of Historical Research - Custodes Rotulorum 1544-1646
Institute of Historical Research - Custodes Rotulorum 1660-1828

Radnorshire